"My Roots Are Showing..." is The Fourth Studio Album by American country singer–songwriter K. T. Oslin. It was released on October 1, 1996 via BNA Records and contained ten tracks. The album was co-produced by Oslin and Rick Will. The project contained cover versions of songs first made famous in the country and pop fields. It was Oslin's first studio album release in six years after experiencing personal setbacks. "My Roots Are Showing..." reached peak positions on the country albums chart following its release. It would also spawn two singles issued to country radio in 1996.

Background
K. T. Oslin had several years of country music success in the late 1980s with hits like "80's Ladies," "Hold Me" and "This Woman." Then, in the early 1990s she took a hiatus from her music career and focused on other projects such as acting. Oslin developed a heart condition during her time off, which caused her to receive Quadruple bypass surgery in 1995. She later made a full recovery. 

Oslin was also contemplating a musical comeback. RCA Records executive Joe Galante had offered her a position in the A&R department, but she ultimately declined. Instead, Oslin told Galante about the possibility of recording a dance-flavored country album. However, she was reluctant about the concept and ultimately abandoned the idea when meeting with Nashville writer Robert K. Oermann. Together, the pair found songs that would make up "My Roots Are Showing..". Oslin later stated the album's "roots" came from music that influenced her as a recording artist and performer: bluegrass, folk and blues.

Content and recording
Oermann and Oslin collected ten songs that would make up the album's track listing. She had first found the songs "Down in the Valley" and "Hold Whatcha Got" before finishing finding the remainder of the album's material. All of the album's tracks were covers of songs first made popular by other music artists and writers. Among these songs was Webb Pierce's "Pathway of Teardrops" and Irving Berlin's "I'll See You in C-U-B-A." The album's eventual lead single, "Silver Tongue and Goldplated Lies" was a cover of the original recording by Jan Howard in 1983. Her version had also been a single and released on her studio effort, Tainted Love.

According to Bill Carpenter of Allmusic, the album's material was a mix of dance, rock and blues. For example, Carpenter commented that "Hold Whatcha Got" "rocks so hard it could have shot straight from the Jerry Lee Lewis songbook." Oslin later brought in engineer Rick Will to help with production. Will helped find Nashville session players to perform on the project. In a 1996 interview, Oslin spoke highly of the album's session players: "The songs and the players are the real stars here. I think everyone will copy the sounds on this record." "My Roots Are Showing..." was recorded at Woodland Studios, located in Nashville, Tennessee. Both Oslin and Will served as the project's co-producers, according to the liner notes.

Release and reception

"My Roots Are Showing..." was released on October 1, 1996 on BNA Records. It was Oslin's fourth studio album released in her career. The album was originally issued as both a compact disc and a cassette. It would later be released to digital retailers, including Apple Music. Following its original 1996 release, Joe Galante believed the album to be radio-friendly and for it to perform well on the charts. However, "My Roots Are Showing..." only spent six weeks on the Billboard Top Country Albums and reached a peak position of 45 on the list in October 1996. The record was Oslin's lowest-charting album in the United States. Radio directors were drawn to Oslin's cover of "Silver Tongue and Goldplated Lies," which ultimately prompted her record label to release it as its first single. The single was released via BNA Records in July 1996. Yet after five weeks on the Billboard Hot Country Songs chart, it only reached a peak position of 64.

"My Roots Are Showing..." received mixed reviews from writers and critics following its release. In their October 1996 issue, Billboard magazine called the album "eclectic Americana" in response to the album's array of musical styles. "She's rearranged everything in her own, quirky style, and the result is a body of related work that would play just as well at the Rainbow Room as on a Mississippi riverboat," they commented. Meanwhile, Allmusic's Bill Carpenter only gave the project 2.5 out of 5 stars. While he called all of the songs to be "a gem," he also found the album to lack a marketing direction: "The only issue is that this was marketed as a country album when the Nashville element isn't terribly conspicuous."

Track listings

Compact disc version

Cassette version

Digital version

Personnel
All credits are adapted from the liner notes of "My Roots Are Showing..." and Allmusic.

Musical personnel

 Sam Bush – mandolin
 Jerry Douglas – dobro, guitar
 Stuart Duncan – fiddle
 Mary Beth Felts – background vocals
 Joe Galante – background vocals
 Al Hagaman – background vocals
 Marc Harris – keyboards
 The Jordanaires – background vocals
 Jay Joyce – banjo, acoustic guitar, 12-string guitar
 Doug Lancio – acoustic guitar, baritone guitar, electric guitar, steel guitar
 Neal Matthews, Jr. – background vocals
 Susan Nadler – background vocals

 Dan Needham – drums
 Louis Dean Nunley – background vocals
 Robert K. Oermann – background vocals, consultant
 K. T. Oslin – background vocals, lead vocals
 Al Schlitz – background vocals
 Phyllis Schlitz – background vocals
 Evelyn Shriver – background vocals
 Tommy Sims – bass
 Gordon Stoker – background vocals
 Duane West – background vocals
 Rick Will – electric guitar

Technical personnel

 Jay Brown – engineer
 Susan Eddy – art direction
 Marc Frigo – assistant engineer
 Mary Hamilton – art direction
 Kris Kerr – production assistant
 Ken Love – mastering
 Rob McClain – engineer
 K. T. Oslin – producer

 Tom Roady – percussion
 Mark Seliger – photography
 Mike Simmons – engineer
 Paul Simmons – engineer
 Janice Soled – production coordinator
 Julie Wanca – design
 Rick Will – engineer, mixing, producer

Chart performance

Release history

References

1996 albums
K. T. Oslin albums
Albums produced by K. T. Oslin
BNA Records albums